Oliva reticularis, common name the netted olive, is a species of sea snail, a marine gastropod mollusk in the family Olividae, the olives. 

Subspecies
 Oliva reticularis lilacea (Paulmier, 2013)
 Oliva reticularis reticularis Lamarck, 1811
 Oliva reticularis greenwayae Clench, 1937 (taxon inquirendum)
 Oliva reticularis ernesti Petuch, 1990: synonym of Oliva reticularis Lamarck, 1811
 Oliva reticularis olorinella Duclos, 1835: synonym of Oliva oliva (Linnaeus, 1758)

Description
The length of the shell varies between 25 mm and 46 mm.

Distribution
This species occurs in the Caribbean Sea, the Gulf of Mexico and in the Atlantic Ocean off the Bermudas and northern Brazil.

References

 Petuch E.J. & Sargent D.M. (1986). Atlas of the living olive shells of the world. xv + 253 pp., 39 pls. page(s): Page 129, Plate 22, fig 5-7
 Petuch, E. J.; Myers, R. F. (2014). New species and subspecies of olive shells (Gastropoda: Olividae) from the Panamic and Indo-Pacific regions and the Gulf of Mexico. The Festivus. 46(3): 63-74

External links
 Lamarck [J.B.M.de]. (1811). Suite de la détermination des espèces de Mollusques testacés. Annales du Muséum National d'Histoire Naturelle. 16: 300-328
 Gastropods.com: Oliva (Strephona) reticularis
 Petuch E.J. (1990). A new molluscan faunule from the Caribbean coast of Panama. The Nautilus. 104(2): 57-71

reticularis
Gastropods described in 1811